

The Province House (1679–1864) was a 17th-century mansion on old Marlborough Street in Boston, Massachusetts. Built in 1679, it was the home of merchant Peter Sergeant, and after 1716, the official residence of royal governors of the Province of Massachusetts Bay. Known for its great main staircase and original Tudor-style chimney stacks, the building fell into disrepair in the 19th century, partially burned in 1864, and was demolished in 1922.

It has been considered one of the grandest examples of New England colonial architecture. However, only artist drawings of its outside elevation exist today, as well as photographs of its demolition in 1922. The 18th-century artist rendering shown here depicts the residence after the chimney stacks and ornate gables had been removed, in the earlier part of that century. A portion of the stone steps leading from the present street to the former garden remain.

See also
 Ordway Hall (Boston) (1852 – ca. 1864) in the re-purposed Province House building

References

Further reading
  From Twice-Told Tales, v. 2.
 
 
  Digital Book

External links

  ("Made to stand on the cupola of Boston's Province House, where it soon became a local landmark.")
 Boston Public Library. Image of Province House
 The life of Francis Bernard. Royal Governor Francis Bernard resided at the Province House

Former buildings and structures in Boston
Houses completed in 1679
Government Houses of the British Empire and Commonwealth
Financial District, Boston
1679 establishments in Massachusetts
Demolished buildings and structures in Boston
Buildings and structures demolished in 1922
1864 fires in the United States
1864 disasters in the United States